José Miguel Marín Ocotto  (15 March 1945 – 30 December 1991) was an Argentine footballer who played as a goalkeeper and as a football coach. He started his career in Club Atlético Vélez Sarsfield, and became champion with this Argentine team. He then became a Mexican soccer star with Cruz Azul, where he won several championships and became an iconic player. He is widely regarded as one of the best international goalkeepers to play in Mexico.

Early life
Born on May 15, 1945 in Río Tercero, Córdoba, Marín was of a modest family. He grew up working in the greengrocery stores of his neighborhood. Marín would play in the pastures and use the frame of the trees as goals. This caught the attention of a boss at work who subsequently took him to Buenos Aires for a trial at Vélez Sarsfield. Despite conceding eight goals, Victorio Spinetto accepted him into the institution and was enrolled into the club's youth team at 14. Marín was notably disciplined. He devoted himself to train his physical and technical skills twice a day.

Career

Marín began his career with Vélez Sarsfield. He joined Cruz Azul in 1971, making his league debut at Guadalajara on 26 December 1971. Marín played for Cruz Azul until he retired in 1980, appearing in 309 Mexican Primera División matches. Marin won five league championships with Cruz Azul.

Marín was selected in the Argentina national football team for the 1964 Summer Olympics in Tokyo, but did not appear in any matches. He made two appearances for the senior side.

After retiring from playing, Marín became a football coach. He was appointed manager of Cruz Azul during the 1982–83 season. Later, he managed Deportivo Neza.

Nicknames
He was initially referred to by the nickname "El Gato" (The Cat). However, due to his spectacular saves, the label of "El Superman" was applied by the famed commentator and broadcaster Rugama Angel Fernandez. Marin's brilliant career would place him in a unique position in football statistics, with a minimum number of goals allowed, making him the most effective goal keeper in the history of Mexican soccer.

Death
He was working as coach of the University of Querétaro, when he suffered a massive heart attack: on 30 December 1991 he was admitted to the Hospital of Santa Cruz de Querétaro. The news spread like wildfire, a sharp blow to Mexican soccer:  "Superman" had died. The insurmountable "Miguel Marin." His rivals and colleagues came to say their last goodbyes. Marin became a legend who has endured over time, and is a giant in the history of Cruz Azul and Mexican soccer. His remains rest in the La Chacarita Cemetery in his native Argentina.

Honours
Cruz Azul
Mexican Primera División (5): 1971–72, 1972–73, 1973–74, 1978–79, 1979–80

Individual
Mexican Primera División Golden Ball: 1979–80

References

Argentine footballers
Argentina international footballers
Argentine expatriate footballers
Expatriate footballers in Mexico
Footballers at the 1964 Summer Olympics
Olympic footballers of Argentina
Club Atlético Vélez Sarsfield footballers
Cruz Azul footballers
Cruz Azul managers
Argentine Primera División players
Liga MX players
Burials at La Chacarita Cemetery
1945 births
1991 deaths
Association football goalkeepers
Argentine football managers
Sportspeople from Córdoba Province, Argentina